Minna Stocks (1846-1928) was a German painter known for her animal paintings.

Biography
Stocks was born on 24 June 1846 in Schwerin, Germany. She studied with Carl Steffeck, Gustav Graef, and Jeanna Bauck.

She exhibited her work at the Woman's Building at the 1893 World's Columbian Exposition in Chicago, Illinois.

Stocks died on 11 November 1928 in Hinzenhagen, Germany.

References

External links
  
 images of Stocks' work on ArtNet

1846 births
1928 deaths
German women painters
19th-century German women artists
20th-century German women artists
19th-century German painters
20th-century German painters